This is a list of high schools, including those open and closed, in the U.S. state of New Jersey.

Public high schools

Atlantic County

 Absegami High School, Galloway Township
 Atlantic City High School, Atlantic City 
 Atlantic County Institute of Technology, Mays Landing in Hamilton Township
 Buena Regional High School, Buena
 Cedar Creek High School, Egg Harbor City
 Egg Harbor Township High School, Egg Harbor Township
 Hammonton High School, Hammonton
 Mainland Regional High School, Linwood
 Oakcrest High School, Mays Landing in Hamilton Township
 Pleasantville High School, Pleasantville

Bergen County

Henry P. Becton Regional High School, East Rutherford
Bergen County Academies, Hackensack
Bergen County Technical High School, Paramus Campus, Paramus
Bergen County Technical High School, Teterboro Campus, Teterboro
Bergenfield High School, Bergenfield
Bogota High School, Bogota
Cliffside Park High School, Cliffside Park
Closter High School, Closter (closed 1955)
Cresskill High School, Cresskill
Dumont High School, Dumont
Dwight Morrow High School, Englewood
East Rutherford High School, East Rutherford (closed 1971)
Elmwood Park Memorial High School, Elmwood Park
Emerson Jr./Sr. High School, Emerson
Fair Lawn High School, Fair Lawn
Fort Lee High School, Fort Lee
Garfield High School, Garfield
Glen Rock High School, Glen Rock
Hackensack High School, Hackensack
Hasbrouck Heights High School, Hasbrouck Heights
Indian Hills High School, Oakland
Leonia High School, Leonia
Lodi High School, Lodi
Lyndhurst High School, Lyndhurst
Mahwah High School, Mahwah
Midland Park High School, Midland Park
New Milford High School, New Milford
North Arlington High School, North Arlington
Northern Highlands Regional High School, Allendale
Northern Valley Regional High School at Demarest, Demarest
Northern Valley Regional High School at Old Tappan, Old Tappan
Palisades Park High School, Palisades Park
Paramus High School, Paramus
Park Ridge High School, Park Ridge
Pascack Hills High School, Montvale
Pascack Valley High School, Hillsdale
Ramapo High School, Franklin Lakes
Ramsey High School, Ramsey
Ridgefield Memorial High School, Ridgefield
Ridgefield Park High School, Ridgefield Park
Ridgewood High School, Ridgewood
River Dell Regional High School, Oradell
Rutherford High School, Rutherford
Saddle Brook High/Middle School, Saddle Brook
Teaneck High School, Teaneck
Tenafly High School, Tenafly
Waldwick High School, Waldwick
Wallington High School, Wallington
Westwood Regional High School, Westwood
Wood-Ridge High School, Wood-Ridge

Burlington County

Bordentown Regional High School, Bordentown
Burlington City High School, Burlington
Burlington County Institute of Technology Medford Campus, Medford Township
Burlington County Institute of Technology Westampton Campus, Westampton Township
Burlington Township High School, Burlington Township
Cherokee High School, Evesham Township
Cinnaminson High School, Cinnaminson Township
Delran High School, Delran Township
Florence Township Memorial High School, Florence Township
 John F. Kennedy High School, Willingboro Township (closed in 1989)
Lenape High School, Medford
Maple Shade High School, Maple Shade Township
Moorestown High School, Moorestown Township
Northern Burlington County Regional High School, Columbus, Mansfield Township
Palmyra High School, Palmyra
Pemberton Township High School, Pemberton Township
Rancocas Valley Regional High School, Mount Holly Township
Riverside High School, Riverside
Seneca High School, Tabernacle Township
Shawnee High School, Medford
Willingboro High School, Willingboro Township

Camden County

Audubon High School, Audubon
Brimm Medical Arts High School, Camden
Camden Academy Charter High School, Camden
Camden County Technical Schools
Gloucester Township Technical High School, Gloucester Township
Pennsauken Technical High School, Pennsauken Township
Camden Big Picture Learning Academy, Camden (formerly MetEast High School)
Camden High School, Camden
Cherry Hill Alternative High School, Cherry Hill
Cherry Hill High School East, Cherry Hill
Cherry Hill High School West, Cherry Hill
Collingswood High School, Collingswood
Creative Arts Morgan Village Academy, Camden
Eastern Regional High School, Voorhees
Gloucester City Junior-Senior High School, Gloucester City
Haddon Heights High School, Haddon Heights
Haddon Township High School, Haddon Township
Haddonfield Memorial High School, Haddonfield
Highland Regional High School, Blackwood
LEAP Academy University Charter School, Camden
Lindenwold High School, Lindenwold
Overbrook High School, Pine Hill
Pennsauken High School, Pennsauken Township
Sterling High School, Somerdale
Timber Creek Regional High School, Erial
Triton Regional High School, Runnemede
Woodrow Wilson High School, Camden
Winslow Township High School, Atco

Cape May County

 Cape May County Technical High School, Cape May Court House 
 Lower Cape May Regional High School, Cape May
 Middle Township High School, Cape May Court House 
 Ocean City High School, Ocean City
 Wildwood High School, Wildwood

Cumberland County

Bridgeton High School, Bridgeton
Cumberland County Technology Education Center, Vineland
Cumberland Regional High School, Seabrook
Memorial High School, Millville
Millville Senior High School, Millville
Vineland High School, Vineland

Essex County

American History High School, Newark
Bard High School Early College Newark, Newark
Barringer High School, Newark
Belleville High School, Belleville
Bloomfield High School, Bloomfield
James Caldwell High School, West Caldwell
Cedar Grove High School, Cedar Grove
Central High School, Newark
Columbia High School, Maplewood
East Orange Campus High School, East Orange
East Orange STEM Academy, East Orange
East Side High School, Newark
Essex County Vocational Schools, Bloomfield, Newark, North 13th Street and West Caldwell campuses (entries elsewhere in list)
Bloomfield Tech High School, Bloomfield
Newark Tech High School, Newark
North 13th Street Tech, Newark
West Caldwell Tech, West Caldwell
West Market Street Center
Glen Ridge High School, Glen Ridge
Irvington High School, Irvington
Livingston High School, Livingston
Millburn Senior High School, Millburn
Montclair High School, Montclair
Newark Arts High School, Newark
Newark Collegiate Academy, Newark
Newark Early College High School, Newark
Newark Vocational High School, Newark
North Star Academy Charter School, Newark
Nutley High School, Nutley
Orange High School, Orange
Science Park High School, Newark
The Paulo Freire School, Newark
Malcolm X Shabazz High School, Newark
Technology High School, Newark
Cicely Tyson School of Performing and Fine Arts, East Orange
University High School (New Jersey), Newark
Verona High School, Verona
Weequahic High School, Newark
West Essex High School, North Caldwell
West Orange High School, West Orange
West Side High School, Newark

Gloucester County

Clayton High School, Clayton
Clearview Regional High School, Mullica Hill
Delsea Regional High School, Franklinville
Deptford Township High School, Deptford
Gateway Regional High School, Woodbury Heights
Glassboro High School, Glassboro
Gloucester County Institute of Technology, Sewell
Kingsway Regional High School, Woolwich Township
Paulsboro High School, Paulsboro
Pitman High School, Pitman
Washington Township High School, Sewell
West Deptford High School, West Deptford
Williamstown High School, Williamstown
Woodbury Junior-Senior High School, Woodbury

Hudson County

Bayonne High School, Bayonne
County Prep High School, Jersey City
Create Charter High School, Jersey City (closed as of June 2010)
William L. Dickinson High School, Jersey City
James J. Ferris High School, Jersey City
Harrison High School, Harrison
Hoboken Junior Senior High School, Hoboken
Hudson County Schools of Technology, Jersey City, North Bergen, Secaucus campuses
High Tech High School, North Bergen
Infinity Institute, Jersey City
Kearny High School, Kearny
Liberty High School, Jersey City
Lincoln High School, Jersey City
Dr. Ronald E. McNair Academic High School, Jersey City
Memorial High School, West New York
M.E.T.S. Charter School, Jersey City
North Bergen High School, North Bergen
Secaucus High School, Secaucus
University Academy Charter High School, Jersey City
Henry Snyder High School, Jersey City
Union City High School, Union City
Weehawken High School, Weehawken

Hunterdon County

Delaware Valley Regional High School, Frenchtown
Hunterdon Central Regional High School, Flemington
Hunterdon County Polytech Career Academy, Raritan Township
North Hunterdon High School, Annandale
South Hunterdon Regional High School, Lambertville
Voorhees High School, Glen Gardner

Mercer County

Capital Preparatory Charter High School, Trenton (closed as of June 2011)
Daylight/Twilight Alternative High School, Trenton
Ewing High School, Ewing Township
Hamilton East-Steinert High School, Hamilton Township
Hamilton North-Nottingham High School, Hamilton Township
Hamilton West-Hamilton High School, Hamilton Township
Hightstown High School, Hightstown
Hopewell Valley Central High School, Hopewell Township
Marie H. Katzenbach School for the Deaf, Ewing Township
Lawrence High School, Lawrenceville
Princeton High School, Princeton
Robbinsville High School, Robbinsville
Trenton Central High School, Trenton
Trenton Central High School West, Trenton
West Windsor-Plainsboro High School South, Princeton Junction

Middlesex County

Academy for Urban Leadership Charter High School, Perth Amboy
Carteret High School, Carteret
Colonia High School, Colonia
Dunellen High School, Dunellen
East Brunswick High School, East Brunswick
Edison High School, Edison
Highland Park High School, Highland Park
John F. Kennedy Memorial High School, Iselin
J.P. Stevens High School, Edison
Metuchen High School, Metuchen
Middlesex County Vocational and Technical Schools
East Brunswick Technical High School, East Brunswick
Middlesex County Academy for Science, Mathematics and Engineering Technologies, Edison
Perth Amboy Technical High School, Perth Amboy
Piscataway Technical High School, Piscataway
Middlesex County Academy for Allied Health and Biomedical Sciences, Woodbridge Township
Middlesex High School, Middlesex
Monroe Township High School, Monroe
New Brunswick High School, New Brunswick
New Brunswick Health Sciences Technology High School, New Brunswick
North Brunswick Township High School, North Brunswick
Old Bridge High School, Old Bridge
Perth Amboy High School, Perth Amboy
Piscataway Township High School, Piscataway
Sayreville War Memorial High School, Parlin
South Amboy Middle High School, South Amboy
South Brunswick High School, Monmouth Junction
South Plainfield High School, South Plainfield
South River High School, South River
Spotswood High School, Spotswood
West Windsor-Plainsboro High School North, Plainsboro
Woodbridge High School, Woodbridge

Monmouth County

Academy Charter High School, Lake Como
Academy of Allied Health & Science, Neptune
Allentown High School, Allentown
Asbury Park High School, Asbury Park
Biotechnology High School, Freehold
Class Academy, Long Branch
Colts Neck High School, Colts Neck
Communications High School, Wall
Freehold High School, Freehold Borough
Freehold Township High School, Freehold Township
High Technology High School, Lincroft
Holmdel High School, Holmdel
Howell High School, Farmingdale
Henry Hudson Regional High School, Highlands
Keansburg High School, Keansburg
Keyport High School, Keyport
Long Branch High School, Long Branch
Manalapan High School, Englishtown
Manasquan High School, Manasquan
Marine Academy of Science and Technology, Sandy Hook
Marlboro High School, Marlboro
Matawan Regional High School, Aberdeen
Middletown High School North, Middletown
Middletown High School South, Middletown
Monmouth County Vocational Technical High School, Colts Neck
Monmouth Regional High School, Tinton Falls
Neptune High School, Neptune
Ocean Township High School, Oakhurst
Raritan High School, Hazlet
Red Bank Regional High School, Little Silver
Rumson-Fair Haven Regional High School, Rumson
Shore Regional High School, West Long Branch
Wall High School, Wall Township

Morris County

Academy for Law and Public Safety, Butler
The Academy for Mathematics, Science, and Engineering, Rockaway
Boonton High School, Boonton
Butler High School, Butler
Chatham High School, Chatham
Chatham Borough High School, Chatham Borough (closed 1988 and merged to form Chatham High School)
Chatham Township High School, Chatham Borough (closed 1988 and merged to form Chatham High School)
Dover High School, Dover
Hanover Park High School, East Hanover
Jefferson Township High School, Oak Ridge
Kinnelon High School, Kinnelon
Madison High School, Madison
Montville Township High School, Montville
Morris County School of Technology, Denville
Morris Hills High School, Rockaway
Morris Knolls High School, Denville
Morristown High School, Morristown
Mount Olive High School, Flanders
Mountain Lakes High School, Mountain Lakes
Parsippany High School, Parsippany
Parsippany Hills High School, Morris Plains
Pequannock Township High School, Pompton Plains
Randolph High School, Randolph
Roxbury High School, Succasunna
West Morris Central High School, Long Valley
West Morris Mendham High School, Mendham
Whippany Park High School, Whippany

Ocean County

Barnegat High School, Barnegat
Brick Township High School, Brick
Brick Township Memorial High School, Brick
OCVTS Performing Arts Academy, Lakehurst
Central Regional High School, Bayville
Jackson Liberty High School, Jackson
Jackson Memorial High School, Jackson
Lacey Township High School, Lanoka Harbor
Lakewood High School, Lakewood
Manchester Township High School, Manchester
Marine Academy of Technology and Environmental Science, Manahawkin
New Egypt High School, New Egypt
Pinelands Regional High School, Tuckerton
Point Pleasant Beach High School, Point Pleasant Beach
Point Pleasant Boro High School, Point Pleasant
Southern Regional High School, Manahawkin
Toms River High School East, Toms River
Toms River High School North, Toms River
Toms River High School South, Toms River

Passaic County

Academy High School (New Jersey), Clifton
Clifton High School, Clifton
Eastside High School, Paterson
School of Culinary Arts, Hospitality and Tourism
School of Government and Public Administration
School of Information Technology
Garrett Morgan Academy, Paterson
HARP Academy, Paterson
Hawthorne High School, Hawthorne
International High School, Paterson
John F. Kennedy High School, Paterson
School of Architecture and Construction Trades
School of Business, Technology, Marketing and Finance
School of Education and Training
School of Science, Technology, Engineering and Mathematics
Lakeland Regional High School, Wanaque
Manchester Regional High School, Haledon
MPACT Academy, Paterson
Panther Academy, Paterson
Rosa L. Parks School of Fine and Performing Arts, Paterson
Passaic Academy for Science and Engineering, Passaic
Passaic County Technical Institute, Wayne
Passaic High School, Passaic
Passaic Preparatory Academy, Passaic
Passaic Valley Regional High School, Little Falls
Paterson Charter School for Science and Technology, Paterson
Pompton Lakes High School, Pompton Lakes
Public Safety Academy, Paterson
Sports and Business Academy, Paterson
Wayne Hills High School, Wayne
Wayne Valley High School, Wayne
West Milford High School, West Milford

Salem County

Arts, Science, and Technology High School, Woodstown
Penns Grove High School, Carneys Point
Pennsville Memorial High School, Pennsville
Salem County Career and Technical High School, Pilesgrove
Salem High School, Salem
Arthur P. Schalick High School, Pittsgrove
Woodstown High School, Woodstown

Somerset County

Bernards High School, Bernardsville
Bound Brook High School, Bound Brook
Bridgewater-Raritan High School, Bridgewater
Central Jersey College Prep Charter School, Somerset
Franklin High School, Somerset
Hillsborough High School, Hillsborough
Manville High School, Manville
Montgomery High School, Skillman
North Plainfield High School, North Plainfield
Ridge High School, Basking Ridge
Somerset County Vocational and Technical High School, Bridgewater
Somerville High School, Somerville
Watchung Hills Regional High School, Warren

Sussex County

High Point Regional High School, Sussex
Hopatcong High School, Hopatcong
Kittatinny Regional High School, Newton
Lenape Valley Regional High School, Stanhope
Newton High School, Newton
Sparta High School, Sparta
Sussex County Technical School, Sparta
Vernon Township High School, Vernon
Wallkill Valley Regional High School, Hamburg

Union County

David Brearley High School, Kenilworth
Abraham Clark High School, Roselle
Cranford High School, Cranford
Jonathan Dayton High School, Springfield
Elizabeth academies
J. Christian Bollwage Finance Academy
John E. Dwyer Technology Academy
Thomas A. Edison Career and Technical Academy
Elizabeth High School
Admiral William Halsey Leadership Academy
Alexander Hamilton Preparatory Academy
Thomas Jefferson Arts Academy
Governor Livingston High School, Berkeley Heights
Hillside High School, Hillside
Arthur L. Johnson High School, Clark
Linden High School, Linden
New Providence High School, New Providence
Barack Obama Green Charter High School, Plainfield
Plainfield Academy for the Arts and Advanced Studies, Plainfield
Plainfield High School, Plainfield
Rahway High School, Rahway
Roselle Park High School, Roselle Park
Scotch Plains-Fanwood High School, Scotch Plains
Summit High School, Summit
Union County Academy for Allied Health Sciences, Scotch Plains
Union County Academy for Information Technology, Scotch Plains
Union County Academy for Performing Arts, Scotch Plains
Union County Magnet High School, Scotch Plains
Union County Vocational-Technical High School, Scotch Plains
Union Senior High School, Union
Westfield High School, Westfield

Warren County

 Belvidere High School, Belvidere (9-12)
 Hackettstown High School, Hackettstown (9-12)
 North Warren Regional High School, Blairstown (7-12)
 Phillipsburg High School, Phillipsburg (9-12)
 Warren County Technical School, Washington (9-12)
 Warren Hills Regional High School, Washington (9-12)

Private high schools

Atlantic County
 Atlantic Christian School, Egg Harbor Township
 Champion Baptist Academy, Absecon
 Coastal Learning Center Atlantic, Northfield
 Highland Academy, Absecon
 Holy Spirit High School, Absecon
 Life Mission Training Center, Hammonton
 St. Augustine Preparatory School, Richland
 St. Joseph Academy, Hammonton
 The Pilgrim Academy, Egg Harbor City
 Trocki Jewish Community Day School, Egg Harbor Township

Bergen County
Academy of the Holy Angels, Demarest
Barnstable Academy, Oakland
Bergen Catholic High School, Oradell
Community High School, Teaneck
Don Bosco Preparatory High School, Ramsey
Dwight-Englewood School, Englewood
Frisch School, Paramus
Hackensack Christian School, Hackensack
 Heichal HaTorah, Teaneck
Holmstead School, Ridgewood
High Point School of Bergen County, Lodi
Immaculate Conception High School, Lodi
Immaculate Heart Academy, Washington Township
Ma'ayanot Yeshiva High School, Teaneck
Metro Schechter Academy, Teaneck (closed in 2006)
Newbury Academy, Dumont
Paramus Catholic High School, Paramus
Queen of Peace High School, North Arlington closed 2017
Sage Day School, Rochelle Park
Saint Joseph Regional High School, Montvale
St. Mary High School (Rutherford, New Jersey), Rutherford
Saddle River Day School, Saddle River
Schechter Regional High School, Teaneck
Torah Academy of Bergen County, Teaneck
Yeshiva Ohr Hatalmud, Englewood

Burlington County
Calvary Christian School, Willingboro
Doane Academy, Burlington (K-12)
Hampton Academy, Mount Holly
Heritage Christian Academy, Mount Laurel
Holy Cross Preparatory Academy, Delran
Life Center Academy, Burlington
Moorestown Friends School, Moorestown

Camden County
 Bancroft School at Voorhees Pediatric Facility, Voorhees
 Baptist Regional School, Haddon Heights
 Bishop Eustace Preparatory School, Pennsauken
 Brookfield Academy, Cherry Hill
 Camden Catholic High School, Cherry Hill
 Delaware Valley Torah Institute, Cherry Hill
 Gloucester Catholic High School, Gloucester City
 J.D.T. Christian Academy, Pennsauken
 The King's Christian School, Cherry Hill, New Jersey
 Kingsway Learning Center Haddonfield Campus, Haddonfield
 Paul VI High School, Haddonfield
 Stratford Classical Christian Academy, Stratford
 Urban Promise Academy, Camden

Cape May County
 Cape Christian Academy, Cape May Court House
 Families United Network Academy, Tuckahoe
 Wildwood Catholic High School, Wildwood

Cumberland County
Sacred Heart High School, Vineland (closed at the end of the 2012-13 school year)

Essex County
Ahlus Sunnah School, East Orange
Chad Science Academy, Newark
Christ the King Preparatory School, Newark
Essex Catholic High School, Newark (closed at end of 2002-03 school year)
Essex Valley School, West Caldwell
Golda Och Academy, West Orange (formerly Solomon Schechter Day School of Essex and Union)
The Gramon School, Fairfield
Immaculate Conception High School, Montclair
Independence High School, Irvington
Jersey Preparatory School, Newark
Rae Kushner Yeshiva High School, Livingston
Lacordaire Academy, Upper Montclair
Marylawn of the Oranges High School, South Orange (closed at end of 2012-13 school year
The Milton School, Millburn
Montclair Kimberley Academy, Montclair
Mount Saint Dominic Academy, West Caldwell
Newark Academy, Livingston
Our Lady of Good Counsel High School, Newark (closed as of 2006)
Saint Benedict's Preparatory School, Newark
St. James Preparatory School, Newark
St. Leo's Center, Irvington
St. Vincent Academy, Newark
Seton Hall Preparatory School, West Orange

Gloucester County
Gloucester County Christian School, Sewell
Our Lady of Mercy Academy, Newfield
Victory Christian School, Williamstown

Hudson County
Academy of St. Aloysius, Jersey City (closed 2006)
Academy of Sacred Heart High School, Hoboken (closed 2006)
Caritas Academy, Jersey City (closed 2008)
Holy Family Academy, Bayonne (closed at end of 2012-13 school year)
Hudson Catholic Regional High School, Jersey City
The Hudson School, Hoboken
Kenmare High School, Jersey City
Marist High School, Bayonne
Messiah Christian High School, Bayonne
Miftaahul Uloom Academy, Union City
St. Aloysius High School, Jersey City (closed 2007)
St. Anthony High School, Jersey City (closed 2017)
St. Dominic Academy, Jersey City
Saint Joseph of the Palisades High School, West New York (closed in 2009)
St. Mary High School, Jersey City (closed in 2011)
St. Peter's Preparatory School, Jersey City
Yeshiva Gedolah School of Bayonne, Bayonne

Mercer County 
Hun School of Princeton, Princeton
Islamic School of Trenton, Trenton
Lawrenceville School, Lawrenceville / Lawrence Township
The Lewis School of Princeton, Princeton
Notre Dame High School, Lawrenceville / Lawrence Township
Peddie School, Hightstown
The Pennington School, Pennington
Princeton Day School, Princeton
Princeton International School of Mathematics and Science, Princeton
St. Mary's Cathedral High School, Trenton (closed 1972)
Stuart Country Day School, Princeton
Trenton Catholic Academy, Trenton
Villa Victoria Academy, Ewing
Wilberforce School, Princeton Junction

Middlesex County
Al-Minhaal Academy, South Plainfield
Moshe Aaron Yeshiva High School, South River
Rabbi Jacob Joseph Yeshiva School, Edison
Cardinal McCarrick High School, South Amboy (closed at the end of the 2014-15 school year, in the wake of an increasing financial deficit.)
Noor-Ul-Iman School, Monmouth Junction
St. Joseph High School (Metuchen, New Jersey), Metuchen
St. Peter the Apostle High School, New Brunswick
St. Thomas Aquinas High School (New Jersey), Edison (renamed from Bishop George Ahr High School in 2019)
Timothy Christian School (New Jersey), Piscataway
Wardlaw-Hartridge School, Edison
Yeshiva Tiferes Naftoli, Jamesburg
HEROES Academy for the Gifted, New Brunswick

Monmouth County
Baytul-Iman Academy, Matawan
Christian Brothers Academy, Lincroft
Collier High School, Wickatunk
High Point Schools, Morganville
Hillel Yeshiva, Ocean
Ilan High School, Long Branch
 Jersey Shore Free School, a Sudbury school, Marlboro/Colts Neck, NJ
Mater Dei High School, Middletown
Monmouth Academy, Howell
New Jersey United Christian Academy, Cream Ridge
Ranney School, Tinton Falls
Red Bank Catholic High School, Red Bank
St. George Orthodox Christian High School, Howell
St. John Vianney High School, Holmdel
St. Rose High School, Belmar
Talmudical Academy of Central New Jersey, Howell
Trinity Hall (New Jersey), Tinton Falls

Morris County
Academy of Saint Elizabeth, Morris Township
Bayley-Ellard High School, Madison (closed 2005)
The Craig School, Lincoln Park
Delbarton School, Morris Township
Morris Catholic High School, Denville
Morristown–Beard School, Morristown
Parsippany Christian School, Morris Plains
Sage Day School, Boonton
Shepard School, Morristown
Trinity Christian School, Montville
Villa Walsh Academy, Morris Township

Ocean County
Bais Kaila Torah Preparatory High School for Girls, Lakewood
Bais Shaindel High School, Lakewood
Bais Yaakov High School, Lakewood
Birchas Chaim, Lakewood
Bnos Bais Yaakov High School, Lakewood
Donovan Catholic High School, Toms River (known as Monsignor Donovan High School until 2014)
Mesivta High School of Bradley, Lakewood
Mesivta Keser Torah School, Lakewood
Mesivta of Lakewood School, Lakewood
Mesivta Pe'er Hatorah School, Lakewood
New Jersey Center for Judaic Study, Lakewood
Ohr Chodosh School, Lakewood
Yeshiva Bais Aharon School, Lakewood

Passaic County
Al-Ghazaly High School, Wayne
Al-Huda School, Paterson
Bais Yaakov of Passaic High School, Passaic
Benway School, Wayne
Collegiate School, Passaic
DePaul Catholic High School, Wayne
Don Bosco Technical High School (New Jersey), Paterson (closed 2002)
Eastern Christian High School, North Haledon
Harp Academy, Paterson
Hawthorne Christian Academy, Hawthorne
Mary Help of Christians Academy, North Haledon
Mesivta Zichron Baruch, Clifton
Neumann Preparatory School, Wayne (closed 1990)
Paterson Catholic High School, Paterson (closed 2010)
Paul VI High School (Clifton, New Jersey), Clifton (closed 1970)
Pioneer Academy, Wayne
Pope Pius XII High School, Passaic (closed 1983)

Somerset County
East Mountain School, Belle Mead
Gill St. Bernard's School, Gladstone
Green Brook Academy, Bound Brook
Immaculata High School, Somerville
Mount St. Mary Academy, Watchung
Pingry School, Martinsville
Purnell School, Pottersville
Rutgers Preparatory School, Somerset
Sage Day High School, Franklin
Somerset Christian Academy, Zarephath  now Pillar College, Newark

Sussex County
Pope John XXIII High School, Sparta
 Veritas Christian Academy, Sparta

Union County
Benedictine Academy, Elizabeth
Bruriah High School for Girls, Elizabeth
Cornerstone Day School
Hillcrest Academy, Scotch Plains
Jewish Educational Center / RTMA, Elizabeth
Kent Place School, Summit
Mother Seton Regional High School, Clark
Oak Knoll School of the Holy Child, Summit
Oratory Preparatory School, Summit
Rav Teitz Mesivta Academy, Elizabeth
Roselle Catholic High School, Roselle
St. Mary of the Assumption High School, Elizabeth
St. Patrick High School, Elizabeth closed in 2002 and became the Patrick School
Union Catholic Regional High School, Scotch Plains

Warren County
 Blair Academy, Blairstown
 Phillipsburg Catholic High School, Phillipsburg  (closed 1994)

See also
List of school districts in New Jersey

References

External links
State lists of New Jersey schools
New Jersey school ratings from GreatSchools.net
SchoolTree.org

High schools in New Jersey
New Jersey
High schools